Emily Jill Wadsworth (born 8 August 1999) is a British professional racing cyclist, who currently rides for UCI Women's Continental Team . In October 2020, she rode in the 2020 Three Days of Bruges–De Panne race in Belgium.

References

External links

1999 births
Living people
British female cyclists
Place of birth missing (living people)
People from South Oxfordshire District
Sportspeople from Oxfordshire
21st-century British women